The Niigata Comic Market, commonly known as , is a bimonthly dōjinshi comic book convention held in Niigata, Niigata Prefecture, Japan. It takes place at either Toki Messe or the Niigata-shi Sangyou Shinkou Center, and between 7,000 and 10,000 people regularly attend each event. It is the largest dōjinshi comic book market held on the west coast of Japan. It was first held in 1983.

History
After the inauguration of the Gataket secretariat in September 1982, the first Niigata Comic Market took place in January 1983. It had forty-six direct participation circles and nine consignment participation circles.

On 14 November 1999, Gataket50 took place. Radio actor Tomokazu Seki and Miki Nagasawa were invited to participate in the event, commemorating the 50th session of the event. Gataket100 took place on 31 August 2008 and featured radio actors Shūichi Ikeda and Tōru Furuya.

Since the beginning of the 2000s, the number of participating circles has continued to decrease, while the intervals between holding Gattackets have shortened. In 1999, when it was at its peak, there was a maximum of about 2000 circles directly participating at the time of the event, but at the time of the 121st event in 2012, it was 25% of the peak, which is the lowest line for holding an event. As it became impossible to secure 500 circles, Fumihiko Sakata asked a circle with experience to participate, extended the deadline for accepting participation applications, and finally held the event. It has been pointed out that the decrease in the number of participating circles may be due to the fact that the frequency of holding events has been increased too much.

Comic markets relating to Niigata Comic Market

Gataket Special
Gataket section where Cosplay is prohibited.

Cosplay Gataket
Gataket section exclusively for Cosplay circles (groups).

Gataket in Nagaoka
Literary coterie magazine spot sale association held in Nagaoka City in Niigata Prefecture. Nagaoka version of Gataket. It is chiefly held in Hive Nagaoka.

Gataket & Okaket
Comic market held in Nagaoka City in Niigata Prefecture. Nagaoka version of Niigata Comic Market. It is held at Hive Nagaoka.

Niigata COMITIA
Niigata version of COMITIA under direction of the Gataket secretariat. It is held inside the Toki Messe conference room or main hall twice a year, usually in April and September.

Gataket shop
The Gataket secretariat manages a dōjinshi and painting materials shop in downtown Niigata.

Niigata Manga Competition
The  is a Manga contest held annually in Niigata City every September. It is sponsored by the Niigata Manga Competition planning committee. It is jointly sponsored by the Niigata Comic Market, the city of  Niigata, and the Japan Animation and Manga College, a local vocational school in Niigata city. The competition has been held every year since 1998. It is unique due to the rarity of its sponsorship: a local municipal government sponsors the manga competition.

References

Related Pages
Comiket

External links
 Gataket & Gataket SHOP
 Niigata Manga Taisho Official site

 

Doujin
Book fairs in Japan
Comics conventions
Recurring events established in 1983
Niigata (city)
Tourist attractions in Niigata Prefecture